Susan Haskell (born June 10, 1968) is a Canadian actress. She played the role of Marty Saybrooke on the ABC soap opera One Life to Live.

Personal life
She graduated from The American Academy of Arts in 1991.

Haskell also appeared on Port Charles in 2001 as Granya Thornhart, opposite her former One Life to Live love interest (and real-life husband), Thorsten Kaye, with whom she has two daughters McKenna (born February 2003) and Marlowe Marann (born January 28, 2007).

Career
Haskell portrayed this role from December 1991 until August 1997, with two brief visits in January 2004 and January 2005. She returned again for an extended stay in mid-2008, first appearing onscreen on June 11, 2008. Haskell won two Daytime Emmy Awards, in 1994 for Outstanding Supporting Actress for the role in 1994, and in 2009 for  Outstanding Lead Actress. At the time of Haskell's 2008 return, Marty was called "one of those tentpole characters that everyone who has watched One Life to Live at some point remembers." It was noted that the 1993 story of the character's gang rape led by Todd Manning "is one of the show's most remembered and impactful."

When Haskell was expecting her second child with Kaye, the role of Marty was recast in November 2006 with Christina Chambers. Chambers exited the show in November 2007, a year after her debut, and Haskell returned in mid-2008.

Television filmography
Sliders as Susannah Morehouse (1997 episode "Oh Brother, Where Art Thou?")
One Life to Live as Dr. Margaret "Marty" Saybrooke (1992–1997, 2004, 2005, 2008–2011)
Port Charles as Granya Thornhart (2001)
JAG as Lt. Cmdr. Jordan Parker (1998–2001) (recurring)
The Good Shepherd (2006)
Crossing Jordan as Jane Newman (2004)

References

External links

Susan Haskell profile – SoapCentral.com

1968 births
Canadian television actresses
Canadian soap opera actresses
Living people
Actresses from Toronto
Daytime Emmy Award for Outstanding Lead Actress in a Drama Series winners
Daytime Emmy Award for Outstanding Supporting Actress in a Drama Series winners
Daytime Emmy Award winners